The Nancy Drew Files, or the Nancy Drew Case Files, is a detective fiction series started in 1986 and released by Simon & Schuster, New York. It is a spin-off of the original series of novels featuring Nancy Drew, with a greater emphasis on adventure, malice and romance. All the books have been written under the pseudonym Carolyn Keene. This series has been targeted at readers who are age eleven and up. With a new book released almost every month, 124 titles were released in 11 years. More than 17 million copies are in print and the books have appeared on the bestseller lists of Publishers Weekly, B. Dalton, and Waldenbooks. In 2014, Simon & Schuster started releasing this series in eBook format.

Series background
The Nancy Drew Files is a spin-off from the Nancy Drew series. The stories follow teenage detective Nancy Drew. Her father, Carson Drew, is a successful attorney and a widower. Their house is taken care of by their full-time housekeeper, Hannah Gruen. Nancy's companions are usually her friends Bess Marvin and George Fayne, no matter whether she is sleuthing or shopping. Her boyfriend, Ned Nickerson also helps her with investigations. Contrary to their stable relationship in the original Nancy Drew series, Nancy and Ned's relationship is given more depth, and the two are portrayed as a somewhat dysfunctional couple. They break-up and reconcile multiple times throughout the series. But in the last book of this series, it is shown that they kept dating each other.

Notable books
Secrets Can Kill (#1), Stay Tuned for Danger (#17), Death by Design (#30), and The Final Scene (#38) were all adapted into the popular Nancy Drew video game series by Her Interactive.
Two Points to Murder (#8) features the first break-up between Nancy and Ned.
Till Death Do Us Part (#24) sees Ned Nickerson proposing to Nancy, although she turns him down.
The Suspect Next Door (#39) launched a spin-off of The Nancy Drew Files series, titled River Heights. However, that series was a romance series, with occasional cameos by Nancy.
All books from #112 (For Love or Money) to #119 (Against the Rules) feature stills from the 1995 television adaption as the covers.

Development
The Nancy Drew Files is the first spin-off from the Nancy Drew Mystery Stories. The series was developed by the Stratemeyer Syndicate, in its final year. The series was first introduced in two books from the Nancy Drew Mystery Stories, #77: The Bluebeard Room, and #78: The Phantom of Venice. These two books were much more modern and serious, while also featuring romance. These two books were the final books overseen by the Syndicate, prior to its sale to Simon & Schuster in 1986. The publishers soon launched The Nancy Drew Files concurrent to the original series, to aim for more mature readers.

The series is known as the most successful spin-off of the original book series, and also inspired a similar spin-off for The Hardy Boys. In 1995, the series reduced its release rate in half, by beginning to release a book every other month, instead of every month. Finally, the series was cancelled in 1997, in a mass cancellation of all mature-themed Nancy Drew and The Hardy Boys spin-offs.

Television adaptation
The 1995 television adaption, Nancy Drew, was based on The Nancy Drew Files. The adaption had very little to do with The Nancy Drew Files series, other than its modern and trendy setting, more mature themes, and Nancy and Ned's relationship issues. The series featured a college-aged Nancy, who moved to New York City, to attend college and live with Bess (who was an advice columnist) and George (a mail carrier, and amateur filmmaker). The series was produced by Canadian production company Nelvana, and filmed in Toronto (with an arc in Paris).

The series' stars — Tracy Ryan, Jhene Erwin, and Joy Tanner — were featured on the covers of the books, which were promotional stills of the television series. The promotion began on the 112th book, For Love or Money, and continued until book 119, Against The Rules. Ironically, For Love or Money was released the month the last episode of the series aired. By the time the books stopped the promotion, the television series had been cancelled for over a year (and in another twist of irony, The Nancy Drew Files would also be cancelled that same year).

List of books in the series
The series featured 124 books (plus a promotional packet, distributed to promote the series ahead of its launch), all of which were edited by Anne Greenberg. Four additional titles of The Nancy Drew Files were planned, three of them rewritten as entries for the original series.

See also

Nancy Drew
Nancy Drew on Campus
List of Nancy Drew books

Notes

References and sources

 Nancy Drew Files
Series of children's books